The sixth election to Carmarthenshire County Council was held on 4 May 2017 as part of wider local elections across Wales. The election was preceded by the 2012 election. It will be followed by the 2022 election

Plaid Cymru narrowly missed out in forming the first majority administration in Carmarthenshire Council's history, despite gaining eight seats in the election. The Labour Party maintained its position from the 2012-2017 term, with the Independents losing many seats in the rural areas of Carmarthenshire to Plaid Cymru. Four candidates (from the seventy four seats) were elected unopposed.

A Plaid Cymru-Independent coalition was formed after the election, with Emlyn Dole remaining as the Leader of Council.

Results Overview 
No Overall Control Retained

|}

Ward results

Abergwili (one seat)

Ammanford (one seat)

Betws (one seat)

Bigyn (two seats)

Burry Port (two seats)

Bynea (one seat)

Carmarthen Town North (two seats)

Carmarthen Town South (two seats)

Carmarthen Town West (two seats)

Cenarth (one seat)

Cilycwm (one seat)
Plaid Cymru had gained Cilycwm at a by-election following the death of the previous Independent member. However, the party did not field a candidate resulting in the seat being captured by an Independent, who had finished second at the by-election.

Cynwyl Elfed (one seat)

Cynwyl Gaeo (one seat)

Dafen (one seat)

Elli (one seat)

Felinfoel (one seat)

Garnant (one seat)

Glanamman (one seat)

Glanymor (two seats)

Glyn (one seat)

Gorslas (two seats)

Hendy (one seat)

Hengoed (two seats)

Kidwelly (one seat)

Laugharne Township (one seat)

Llanboidy (one seat)

Llanddarog (one seat)

Llandeilo (one seat)

Llandovery (one seat)

Llandybie  (two seats)

Llanegwad (one seat)

Llanfihangel Aberbythych (one seat)

Llanfihangel-ar-Arth (one seat)

Llangadog (one seat)

Llangeler (one seat)

Llangennech (two seats)

Llangunnor (one seat)

Llangyndeyrn (one seat)

Llannon (two seats)

Llansteffan (one seat)

Llanybydder (one seat)

Lliedi (two seats)

Llwynhendy (two seats)

Manordeilo and Salem  (one seat)

Pembrey (two seats)

Pen-y-groes (one seat)

Pontamman (one seat)

Pontyberem (one seat)

Quarter Bach  (one seat)

St Clears (one seat)

St Ishmaels (one seat)

Saron (two seats)

Swiss Valley (one seat)

Trelech (one seat)
Plaid Cymru had won the seat from the Independents at a by-election.

Trimsaran (one seat)

Tycroes (one seat)

Tyisha (two seats)

Whitland (one seat)

By-Elections 2017-2022

Saron by-election 2018
A by-election was held in Saron on 19 July 2018 following the death of Plaid Cymru councillor Alun Davies. The seat was won by Plaid Cymru candidate Karen Davies.

References

2017
2017 Welsh local elections
21st century in Carmarthenshire